This is a list of members of the 9th Bundestag – the lower house of parliament of the Federal Republic of Germany, whose members were in office from 1980 until 1983.



Summary 
This summary includes changes in the numbers of the three caucuses (CDU/CSU, SPD, FDP):

Members

A 

 Manfred Abelein, CDU
 Irmgard Adam-Schwaetzer, FDP
 Jochen van Aerssen, CDU
 Karl Ahrens, SPD
 Walter Althammer, CSU
 Max Amling, SPD
 Franz Amrehn, CDU (until 4 October 1981)
 Robert Antretter, SPD
 Hans Apel, SPD
 Gottfried Arnold, CDU
 Heinz Assmann, SPD (from 24 February 1983)
 Dieter Auch, SPD
 Dietrich Austermann, CDU (from 16 April 1982)

B 

 Herbert Baack, SPD
 Dietrich Bahner, CDU
 Egon Bahr, SPD
 Georg Bamberg, SPD (from 2 February 1981)
 Hans Bardens, SPD
 Rainer Barzel, CDU
 Gerhart Baum, FDP
 Richard Bayha, CDU
 Karl Becker, CDU (from 13 September 1982)
 Helmuth Becker, SPD
 Klaus Beckmann, FDP
 Ursula Benedix-Engler, CDU
 Markus Berger, CDU (from 19 June 1981)
 Lieselotte Berger, CDU
 Wolfram Bergerowski, FDP
 Hans Gottfried Bernrath, SPD
 Erich Berschkeit, SPD
 Alfred Biehle, CSU
 Günter Biermann, SPD
 Rudolf Bindig, SPD
 Norbert Blüm, CDU (until 15 June 1981)
 Lieselott Blunck, SPD (from 30 January 1981)
 Friedrich Bohl, CDU
 Wilfried Böhm, CDU
 Rolf Böhme, SPD (until 2 December 1982)
 Jochen Borchert, CDU
 Arne Börnsen, SPD
 Peter Boroffka, CDU (from 6 October 1981)
 Wolfgang Bötsch, CSU
 Hugo Brandt, SPD
 Willy Brandt, SPD
 Gerhard Braun, CDU
 Carola von Braun-Stützer, FDP
 Günther Bredehorn, FDP
 Paul Breuer, CDU
 Werner Broll, CDU
 Alwin Brück, SPD
 Josef Brunner, CSU
 Guido Brunner, FDP (until 28 January 1981)
 Klaus Brunnstein, FDP (from 11 February 1983)
 Hans Büchler, SPD
 Peter Büchner, SPD
 Josef Bugl, CDU
 Klaus Bühler, CDU
 Reinhard Bühling, SPD (from 6 July 1981)
 Andreas von Bülow, SPD
 Albert Burger, CDU (until 10 October 1981)
 Helmut Buschbom, CDU (from 16 June 1981)
 Hermann Buschfort, SPD

C 

 Manfred Carstens, CDU
 Wolf-Michael Catenhusen, SPD
 Joachim Clemens, CDU
 Hugo Collet, SPD
 Franz Josef Conrad, CDU
 Peter Conradi, SPD
 Manfred Coppik, SPD
 Peter Corterier, SPD
 Dieter-Julius Cronenberg, FDP
 Lothar Curdt, SPD
 Herbert Czaja, CDU

D 

 Harm Dallmeyer, CDU
 Klaus Daubertshäuser, SPD
 Herta Däubler-Gmelin, SPD
 Klaus Daweke, CDU
 Karl Deres, CDU
 Nils Diederich, SPD
 Eberhard Diepgen, CDU (until 3 February 1981)
 Klaus von Dohnanyi, SPD (until 26 June 1981)
 Werner Dolata, CDU (from 16 June 1981)
 Werner Dollinger, CSU
 Werner Dörflinger, CDU
 Hansjürgen Doss, CDU (from 20 July 1981)
 Alfred Dregger, CDU
 Rudolf Dreßler, SPD
 Ulrich Dübber, SPD
 Freimut Duve, SPD

E 

 Jürgen Echternach, CDU
 Jürgen Egert, SPD
 Horst Ehmke, SPD
 Herbert Ehrenberg, SPD
 Karl-Arnold Eickmeyer, SPD
 Karl Eigen, CDU
 Norbert Eimer, FDP
 Alfred Emmerlich, SPD
 Wendelin Enders, SPD
 Sibylle Engel, FDP (from 26 June 1981)
 Hans A. Engelhard, FDP
 Matthias Engelsberger, CSU
 Björn Engholm, SPD
 Benno Erhard, CDU
 Brigitte Erler, SPD (from 6 December 1982)
 Josef Ertl, FDP
 Helmut Esters, SPD
 Carl Ewen, SPD
 Ekkehart Eymer, CDU (from 14 January 1981)

F 

 Kurt Faltlhauser, CSU
 Peter Feile, SPD
 Wolfgang Feinendegen, CDU
 Olaf Feldmann, FDP (from 29 January 1981)
 Hermann Fellner, CSU
 Udo Fiebig, SPD
 Dirk Fischer, CDU
 Leni Fischer, CDU
 Gernot Fischer, SPD
 Lothar Fischer, SPD
 Klaus Francke, CDU
 Heinrich Franke, CDU
 Egon Franke, SPD
 Bernhard Friedmann, CDU
 Rita Fromm, FDP
 Anke Fuchs, SPD
 Honor Funk, CDU (from 16 October 1981)
 Rainer Funke, FDP

G 

 Georg Gallus, FDP
 Norbert Gansel, SPD
 Johannes Ganz, CDU
 Klaus Gärtner, FDP
 Hans H. Gattermann, FDP
 Erna-Maria Geier, CDU
 Michaela Geiger, CSU
 Heiner Geißler, CDU
 Wolfgang von Geldern, CDU
 Hans-Dietrich Genscher, FDP
 Haimo George, CDU
 Paul Gerlach, CSU
 Ludwig Gerstein, CDU
 Johannes Gerster, CDU
 Friedrich Gerstl, SPD
 Manfred Geßner, SPD
 Konrad Gilges, SPD
 Horst Ginnuttis, SPD
 Matthias Ginsberg, FDP (from 9 December 1982)
 Eugen Glombig, SPD (from 18 December 1980)
 Michael Glos, CSU
 Fritz-Joachim Gnädinger, SPD
 Horst Gobrecht, SPD
 Eike Götz, CSU (until 8 March 1983)
 Claus Grobecker, SPD
 Horst Grunenberg, SPD
 Martin Grüner, FDP
 Horst Günther, CDU

H 

 Dieter Haack, SPD
 Ernst Haar, SPD
 Lothar Haase, CDU
 Horst Haase, SPD
 Wolfgang Hackel, CDU
 Karl Haehser, SPD
 Hansjörg Häfele, CDU
 Hildegard Hamm-Brücher, FDP
 Franz Handlos, CSU
 Karl-Heinz Hansen, SPD
 August Hanz, CDU
 Liesel Hartenstein, SPD
 Klaus Hartmann, CSU
 Rudolf Hauck, SPD
 Volker Hauff, SPD
 Alo Hauser, CDU
 Hansheinz Hauser, CDU
 Helmut Haussmann, FDP
 Dieter Heistermann, SPD
 Renate Hellwig, CDU
 Herbert Helmrich, CDU
 Ottfried Hennig, CDU
 Ralph Herberholz, SPD
 Adolf Herkenrath, CDU
 Günter Herterich, SPD
 Peter von der Heydt Freiherr von Massenbach, CDU
 Günther Heyenn, SPD
 Ernst Hinsken, CSU
 Burkhard Hirsch, FDP
 Rüdiger Hitzigrath, SPD (from 6 November 1981)
 Paul Hoffacker, CDU (from 21 December 1982)
 Klaus-Jürgen Hoffie, FDP (until 25 June 1981)
 Peter Wilhelm Höffkes, CSU
 Ingeborg Hoffmann, CDU
 Hajo Hoffmann, SPD
 Karl Hofmann, SPD
 Friedrich Hölscher, FDP
 Erwin Holsteg, FDP
 Uwe Holtz, SPD
 Stefan Höpfinger, CSU
 Hans-Günter Hoppe, FDP
 Erwin Horn, SPD
 Karl-Heinz Hornhues, CDU
 Martin Horstmeier, CDU
 Antje Huber, SPD
 Hans Hubrig, CDU (until 25 March 1982)
 Gunter Huonker, SPD
 Herbert Hupka, CDU
 Agnes Hürland-Büning, CDU
 Heinz Günther Hüsch, CDU
 Hans Graf Huyn, CSU

I 

 Lothar Ibrügger, SPD
 Klaus Immer, SPD

J 

 Claus Jäger, CDU
 Bernhard Jagoda, CDU
 Friedrich-Adolf Jahn, CDU
 Gerhard Jahn, SPD
 Günther Jansen, SPD
 Horst Jaunich, SPD
 Philipp Jenninger, CDU
 Uwe Jens, SPD
 Hans-Joachim Jentsch, CDU (until 8 September 1982)
 Dionys Jobst, CSU
 Wilhelm Jung, CDU
 Kurt Jung, FDP
 Hans-Jürgen Junghans, SPD
 Horst Jungmann, SPD

K 

 Joachim Kalisch, CDU
 Dietmar Kansy, CDU
 Irmgard Karwatzki, CDU
 Peter Keller, CSU
 Ignaz Kiechle, CSU
 Günter Kiehm, SPD
 Walther Leisler Kiep, CDU (until 26 April 1982)
 Klaus Kirschner, SPD
 Peter Kittelmann, CDU
 Hans Hugo Klein, CDU
 Hans Klein, CSU
 Heinrich Klein, SPD
 Detlef Kleinert, FDP
 Karl-Heinz Klejdzinski, SPD
 Helmut Kohl, CDU
 Herbert W Köhler, CDU
 Volkmar Köhler, CDU
 Elmar Kolb, CDU
 Walter Kolbow, SPD
 Horst Korber, SPD (until 2 July 1981)
 Gottfried Köster, CDU
 Rudolf Kraus, CSU
 Reinhold Kreile, CSU
 Volkmar Kretkowski, SPD
 Heinz Kreutzmann, SPD
 Franz Heinrich Krey, CDU
 Hermann Kroll-Schlüter, CDU
 Ursula Krone-Appuhn, CSU
 Klaus Kübler, SPD
 Klaus-Dieter Kühbacher, SPD
 Eckart Kuhlwein, SPD
 Gerhard Kunz, CDU (until 15 June 1981)
 Max Kunz, CSU

L 

 Karl-Hans Laermann, FDP
 Karl-Hans Lagershausen, CDU (from 29 March 1982)
 Uwe Lambinus, SPD
 Otto Graf Lambsdorff, FDP
 Karl Lamers, CDU
 Norbert Lammert, CDU
 Egon Lampersbach, CDU (until 16 December 1982)
 Heinz Landré, CDU
 Manfred Langner, CDU
 Herbert Lattmann, CDU (from 27 April 1982)
 Paul Laufs, CDU
 Georg Leber, SPD
 Karl Heinz Lemmrich, CSU
 Klaus Lennartz, SPD
 Carl Otto Lenz, CDU
 Christian Lenzer, CDU
 Günther Leonhart, SPD
 Renate Lepsius, SPD
 Kurt Leuschner, SPD
 Karl Liedtke, SPD
 Jürgen Linde, SPD
 Helmut Link, CDU
 Josef Linsmeier, CSU
 Eduard Lintner, CSU
 Lothar Löffler, SPD
 Paul Löher, CDU
 Peter Lorenz, CDU
 Julyus Louven, CDU
 Ortwin Lowack, CSU
 Egon Lutz, SPD
 Dagmar Luuk, SPD

M 

 Erich Maaß, CDU
 Theo Magin, CDU
 Erhard Mahne, SPD
 Peter Männing, SPD
 Ursula Männle, CSU (from 17 March 1983)
 Manfred Marschall, SPD
 Anke Martiny-Glotz, SPD
 Werner Marx, CDU
 Ingrid Matthäus-Maier, FDP (until 2 December 1982)
 Hans Matthöfer, SPD
 Erich Meinike, SPD
 Alfred Meininghaus, SPD
 Heinz Menzel, SPD
 Rolf Merker, FDP
 Franz-Josef Mertens, SPD
 Alois Mertes, CDU
 Reinhard Metz, CDU
 Reinhard Meyer zu Bentrup, CDU
 Meinolf Michels, CDU
 Paul Mikat, CDU
 Karl Miltner, CDU
 Peter Milz, CDU
 Wolfgang Mischnick, FDP
 Peter Mitzscherling, SPD
 Helmuth Möhring, SPD
 Jürgen Möllemann, FDP
 Franz Möller, CDU
 Adolf Müller, CDU
 Alfons Müller, CDU
 Hans-Werner Müller, CDU
 Günther Müller, CSU
 Richard Müller, SPD
 Rudolf Müller, SPD
 Adolf Müller-Emmert, SPD
 Franz Müntefering, SPD

N 

 Werner Nagel, SPD
 Karl-Heinz Narjes, CDU (until 9 January 1981)
 Albert Nehm, SPD
 Engelbert Nelle, CDU
 Alfred Hubertus Neuhaus, CDU
 Friedrich Neuhausen, FDP
 Paul Neumann, SPD
 Volker Neumann, SPD
 Hanna Neumeister, CDU
 Lorenz Niegel, CSU
 Wilhelm Nöbel, SPD
 Erke Noth, FDP

O 

 Rainer Offergeld, SPD
 Martin Oldenstädt, CDU (from 5 December 1980)
 Rolf Olderog, CDU
 Jan Oostergetelo, SPD
 Klaus-Dieter Osswald, SPD

P 

 Doris Pack, CDU
 Johann Paintner, FDP
 Peter Paterna, SPD
 Günter Pauli, SPD
 Alfons Pawelczyk, SPD (until 18 December 1980)
 Willfried Penner, SPD
 Heinz Pensky, SPD
 Horst Peter, SPD
 Peter Petersen, CDU
 Gerhard O Pfeffermann, CDU
 Anton Pfeifer, CDU
 Walter Picard, CDU
 Elmar Pieroth, CDU (until 16 July 1981)
 Winfried Pinger, CDU
 Eberhard Pohlmann, CDU
 Heinrich Pohlmeier, CDU
 Walter Polkehn, SPD
 Karl-Heinz Popp, FDP
 Konrad Porzner, SPD (until 28 January 1981)
 Joachim Poß, SPD
 Heinz-Jürgen Prangenberg, CDU
 Albert Probst, CSU
 Rudolf Purps, SPD

R 

 Alois Rainer, CSU
 Heinz Rapp, SPD
 Hermann Rappe, SPD
 Wilhelm Rawe, CDU
 Wolfgang Rayer, SPD
 Gerhard Reddemann, CDU
 Otto Regenspurger, CSU
 Annemarie Renger, SPD
 Friedhelm Rentrop, FDP
 Hans-Peter Repnik, CDU
 Otto Reschke, SPD
 Peter Reuschenbach, SPD
 Bernd Reuter, SPD
 Dietrich Riebensahm, FDP (from 13 December 1982)
 Erich Riedl, CSU
 Horst Ludwig Riemer, FDP
 Heinz Riesenhuber, CDU
 Burkhard Ritz, CDU (until 2 December 1980)
 Helmut Rohde, SPD
 Paul Röhner, CSU (until 11 Mai 1982)
 Ingrid Roitzsch, CDU
 Uwe Ronneburger, FDP
 Klaus Rösch, FDP
 Klaus Rose, CSU
 Philip Rosenthal, SPD
 Kurt Rossmanith, CSU
 Wolfgang Roth, SPD
 Rudolf Ruf, CDU
 Volker Rühe, CDU
 Wolfgang Rumpf, FDP

S 

 Engelbert Sander, SPD
 Helmut Sauer, CDU
 Roland Sauer, CDU
 Franz Sauter, CDU
 Alfred Sauter, CSU
 Hans Georg Schachtschabel, SPD
 Helmut Schäfer, FDP
 Harald B Schäfer, SPD
 Günther Schartz, CDU
 Hermann Schätz, SPD
 Wolfgang Schäuble, CDU
 Hermann Scheer, SPD
 Franz Ludwig Schenk Graf von Stauffenberg, CSU
 Friedel Schirmer, SPD
 Georg Schlaga, SPD
 Günter Schlatter, SPD
 Marie Schlei, SPD (until 3 November 1981)
 Günter Schluckebier, SPD
 Helga Schmedt, SPD
 Hansheinrich Schmidt, FDP
 Hermann Schmidt, SPD (until 10 February 1983)
 Adolf Schmidt, SPD
 Helmut Schmidt, SPD
 Manfred Schmidt, SPD
 Martin Schmidt, SPD
 Renate Schmidt, SPD
 Rudi Schmitt, SPD
 Hans Peter Schmitz, CDU
 Hans Werner Schmöle, CDU
 Jürgen Schmude, SPD
 Oscar Schneider, CSU
 Andreas von Schoeler, FDP (until 8 December 1982)
 Rudolf Schöfberger, SPD
 Reinhard von Schorlemer, CDU
 Heinz Schreiber, SPD
 Ottmar Schreiner, SPD
 Diedrich Schröder, CDU
 Horst Schröder, CDU
 Gerhard Schröder, SPD
 Conrad Schroeder, CDU
 Thomas Schröer, SPD
 Helga Schuchardt, FDP (until 10 February 1983)
 Dieter Schulte, CDU
 Manfred Schulte, SPD
 Gerhard Schulze, CDU (from 4 February 1981)
 Heinz Schwarz, CDU
 Christian Schwarz-Schilling, CDU
 Wolfgang Schwenk, SPD
 Hermann Schwörer, CDU
 Horst Seehofer, CSU
 Rudolf Seiters, CDU
 Willi-Peter Sick, CDU
 Horst Sielaff, SPD
 Wolfgang Sieler, SPD
 Heide Simonis, SPD
 Sigrid Skarpelis-Sperk, SPD
 Hartmut Soell, SPD
 Hermann Otto Solms, FDP
 Dietrich Sperling, SPD
 Adolf Freiherr Spies von Büllesheim, CDU
 Karl-Heinz Spilker, CSU
 Dieter Spöri, SPD
 Carl-Dieter Spranger, CSU
 Rudolf Sprung, CDU
 Erwin Stahl, SPD
 Anton Stark, CDU
 Lutz Stavenhagen, CDU
 Ulrich Steger, SPD
 Heinz-Alfred Steiner, SPD
 Waltraud Steinhauer, SPD
 Hans Stercken, CDU
 Ludwig Stiegler, SPD
 Wilhelm Stöckl, SPD
 Adolf Stockleben, SPD
 Günter Straßmeir, CDU
 Peter Struck, SPD
 Richard Stücklen, CSU
 Hans-Jürgen Stutzer, CDU
 Egon Susset, CDU

T 

 Margitta Terborg, SPD
 Klaus Thüsing, SPD
 Günther Tietjen, SPD
 Ferdinand Tillmann, CDU
 Jürgen Timm, FDP
 Helga Timm, SPD
 Jürgen Todenhöfer, CDU
 Günter Topmann, SPD
 Brigitte Traupe, SPD

U 

 Reinhard Ueberhorst, SPD (until 28 January 1981)
 Kurt Ueberschär, SPD (from 2 February 1981)
 Hermann Josef Unland, CDU
 Hans-Eberhard Urbaniak, SPD

V 

 Roswitha Verhülsdonk, CDU
 Friedrich Vogel, CDU
 Hans-Jochen Vogel, SPD (until 28 January 1981)
 Kurt Vogelsang, SPD
 Wolfgang Vogt, CDU
 Manfred Vohrer, FDP
 Ekkehard Voigt, CSU (from 14 Mai 1982)
 Karsten Voigt, SPD
 Günter Volmer, CDU
 Josef Vosen, SPD
 Friedrich Voss, CSU

W 

 Horst Waffenschmidt, CDU
 Theodor Waigel, CSU
 Alois Graf von Waldburg-Zeil, CDU
 Hans Wallow, SPD (from 29 June 1981)
 Ernst Waltemathe, SPD
 Rudi Walther, SPD
 Jürgen Warnke, CSU
 Ludolf von Wartenberg, CDU
 Gerd Wartenberg, SPD
 Herbert Wehner, SPD
 Karl Weinhofer, SPD
 Dieter Weirich, CDU
 Willi Weiskirch, CDU
 Werner Weiß, CDU
 Gert Weisskirchen, SPD
 Richard von Weizsäcker, CDU (until 15 June 1981)
 Friedrich Wendig, FDP
 Herbert Werner, CDU
 Axel Wernitz, SPD
 Heinz Westphal, SPD
 Helga Wex, CDU
 Gudrun Weyel, SPD
 Helmut Wieczorek, SPD
 Norbert Wieczorek, SPD
 Bruno Wiefel, SPD
 Eugen von der Wiesche, SPD
 Waltrud Will-Feld, CDU
 Dorothee Wilms, CDU
 Willy Wimmer, CDU
 Hermann Wimmer, SPD
 Manfred Wimmer, SPD
 Heinrich Windelen, CDU
 Hans-Jürgen Wischnewski, SPD
 Roswitha Wisniewski, CDU
 Matthias Wissmann, CDU
 Lothar Witek, SPD
 Hans de With, SPD
 Fritz Wittmann, CSU
 Torsten Wolfgramm, FDP
 Erich Wolfram, SPD
 Manfred Wörner, CDU
 Olaf Baron von Wrangel, CDU (until 3 April 1982)
 Lothar Wrede, SPD
 Otto Wulff, CDU
 Richard Wurbs, FDP
 Peter Würtz, SPD
 Peter Kurt Würzbach, CDU
 Günther Wuttke, SPD

Z 

 Fred Zander, SPD
 Werner Zeitler, SPD
 Benno Zierer, CSU
 Friedrich Zimmermann, CSU
 Otto Zink, CDU
 Wolf-Dieter Zumpfort, FDP
 Ruth Zutt, SPD
 Werner Zywietz, FDP

See also 

 Politics of Germany
 List of Bundestag Members

09